Israel Silva Matos de Souza  (born 24 June 1981 in São Paulo, Brazil) is a Guatemalan footballer who plays for Sacachispas.

Club career
Silva started his career in Brazil but his best years as a soccer player came when he went to play in Guatemala. He started at Deportivo Teculután for whom he scored 34 goals and moved on to Xelajú MC and scored twelve goals taking them to a final and won by beating Marquense. Then CSD Municipal put their eye on him and he was transferred there in December 2007. He did not have the best season so the team let him go. Deportivo Jalapa decided to buy him and little by little he became the player he once was. An offer to play in Greece was presented and left to play in Kerkyra FC.

Silva is Xelajú's all-time leader with 176 goals, helping the club win the league championship in 2012.

Naturalization
During the time that Silva was playing in Guatemala he decided to give up his Brazilian citizenship to receive the Guatemalan. He is said that he would love to play for the Guatemala national football team.

External links
 Profile at theplayersagent.com 
 Player profile - AO Kerkyra

References

1981 births
Living people
Brazilian footballers
Guatemalan footballers
Xelajú MC players
C.S.D. Municipal players
A.O. Kerkyra players
F.C. Motagua players
C.D. Real de Minas players
Associação Portuguesa de Desportos players
Antigua GFC players
C.D. Marathón players
Liga Nacional de Fútbol Profesional de Honduras players
Association football forwards
Expatriate footballers in Greece
Expatriate footballers in Guatemala
Footballers from São Paulo